Gabbia is a genus of a freshwater snails with an operculum, aquatic prosobranch gastropod mollusks in the family Bithyniidae.

Glöer & Pešić (2012) recognized Gabbia as a subgenus of the genus Bithynia.

Species 
IUCN Red List of Threatened Species recognized 11 species of Gabbia in 2013.

 Gabbia adusta Ponder, 2003
 Gabbia affinis (Brazier ms Smith, 1882)
Gabbia alticola Annandale, 1918
 Gabbia beecheyi Ponder, 2003
 Gabbia campicola Ponder, 2003
 Gabbia carinata Ponder, 2003
 Gabbia clathrata Ponder, 2003
Gabbia davisi Ponder, 2003
Gabbia erawanensis (Prayoonhong, Chitramvong & Upatham, 1990)
 Gabbia fontana Ponder, 2003
 Gabbia iredalei Cotton, 1942
 Gabbia kendricki Ponder, 2003
 Gabbia kessneri Ponder, 2003
 Gabbia lutaria Ponder, 2003
 Gabbia microcosta Ponder, 2003
 Gabbia napierensis Ponder, 2003
 Gabbia obesa Ponder, 2003
Gabbia orcula Frauenfeld, 1862
 Gabbia pallidula Ponder, 2003
 Gabbia rotunda Ponder, 2003
Gabbia sistanica (Annandale & Prashad, 1919) / Bithynia (Gabbia) sistanica (Annandale & Prashad, 1919)
 Gabbia smithii (Tate, 1882)
 Gabbia spiralis Ponder, 2003
Gabbia stenothyroides Dohrn, 1857
Gabbia travancorica (Benson, 1860)
 Gabbia tumida Ponder, 2003
Gabbia vertiginosa (Frauenfeld, 1862) - synonym: Gabbia australis Tryon, 1865 - type species

Synonyms:
 Gabbia misella Gredler, 1884 is a synonym of Bithynia misella (Gredler, 1884)
 Gabbia pygmaea Preston, 1908 is a synonym of Bithynia pygmaea Preston, 1908
 Gabbia wykoffi Brandt, 1968 is a synonym of Bithynia walkeri (Brandt, 1968)

References

External links

Bithyniidae